is a Japanese actress. She made her debut as a gravure idol in 1990, and also appeared in two adult videos in 1993. She is well known for her roles as Sanami in Death Note and Death Note 2: The Last Name. She reprised her role for TV special The Man who was Made a Fool by L the Most - Detective Matsuda's Case File.

Biography 
Miyuki Komatsu was born on June 5, 1971 in Iwaki, Fukushima. She was born to parents who owned a bowling alley at home. She is the eldest of two sisters. She has been active since childhood and takes the initiative in everything, studying classical ballet from the age of 9 to 20. During her teenage years, she began to enjoy watching Nokin Trio movies that were popular in the early 1980s. When Komatsu entered Iwaki Girls' High School (now Iwaki Sakuragaoka High School), she began to become an actress, influenced by the fact that Kumiko Akiyoshi was a high school graduate and her movies.

Komatsu was scouted in Harajuku while studying at Jissen Women's University. She debuted in 1990 as (小松 美幸) in a swimsuit gravure in the October 23rd issue of Weekly Playboy. In the following year, when she became nude for the first time in the same magazine, her outstanding proportions of B82, W57, and H82 and beautiful breasts that draw beautiful forms became a hot topic, and she gained top-class popularity as a gravure model.

Focusing mainly in magazine gravure, photo collections, and image videos, and in 1992, along with Yoko Hoshino, was appointed as a calendar girl for Kyodo Oil. During this time, Komatsu appeared in the V-cinema Downtown Girls (1991), but in the fourth photo book The LAST SHOW published in July 1992, she became an actress. In August, he played the semi-leading role in the film adaptation of the Kido Prize-winning scenario, Kohei Fukumoto, Kakuhashiki, which is acclaimed as an honorable mention for youth films.

In February 1993, Komatsu played a wet scene in Nikkatsu's movie Sweet Room. In May of the same year, she continued to appear in sexy works, such as showing a bewitching performance in the Kunoichi Ninpocho.

In 1994, she changed her Japanese name as (小松 みゆき). For a while, she appeared in conventional sexy works such as TOKYO BALLADE Dangerous Temptation and Onna Kyoushi, and was active as a hair nude photo book model. After making the Final Nude Declaration in 1994, she played a wide range of roles, mainly in V-cinema and TV dramas.

Her acting ability was also recognized in general works, and from 2003 she made a regular appearance in the television drama Ooku on Fuji TV and became a hot topic.

Personal life 
On December 6, 2009, Komatsu married a director of an apparel company 8 years younger.

On September 14, 2020, Komatsu announces her pregnancy. On February 18, 2021, she gave birth to a baby girl.

Film

Television

References

External links
 Official blog
 Official Instagram account
 

Japanese actresses
Japanese female adult models
Living people
1971 births